In car rallying, over time limit (universally abbreviated as OTL) is a situation where a crew has fallen so far behind their scheduled time that, in most rallies, they are excluded from further competition.

The purpose of OTL is to set a limit on crews so that marshals and other personnel involved in running a rally only need to wait a fixed amount of time after the last car was due before closing the control. Without OTL it could be very difficult to run a rally smoothly without having huge numbers of volunteers willing to wait around indefinitely.

For crews in a stage rally, OTL is a fixed limit of accrued lateness, after which one is no longer allowed to continue to compete. Lateness itself is not necessarily the result of a lack of competitiveness - for example a 10-minute roadside repair on a non-competitive section would not count against that crew's recorded stage times, etc., but it would count towards lateness. Many rallies feature special controls and breaks which allow any accrued lateness to be reset.  In certain rallies (mainly road and navigational) it is also possible to make back lateness during the normal course of the event, subject to certain restrictions.  Also any lateness incurred due to a decision of the organisers or force majeure (i.e. an alteration of the route or hold-up) is not counted against the total lateness.

In a navigational rally or road rally then any crew which turns up at a time control OTL is deemed not to have visited it at all and penalised accordingly: either excluded if the control is a main time control; or typically 30 minutes or 1 fail for other controls.

The official expansion of the term OTL is "over total lateness", although in everyday use only "over time limit" is generally used.

In Australian rallying, the term "out of late time" (OLT) is used.  Whilst not a term used in the Confederation of Australian Motor Sport's Manual of Motor Sport (neither is over time limit), it is a term used commonly on Australian rallying websites in event reports and also in event results.

References

Rally racing